, also known by his Chinese-style name , was a bureaucrat of Ryukyu Kingdom.

Oroku Ryōkyō born to an aristocrat family called Ba-uji Oroku Dunchi, and was given the name . He was the eldest son of Oroku Ryōwa.

He succeeded as the eleventh head of Ba-uji Oroku Dunchi after his father died in 1818.

Oroku was elected as a member of Sanshikan in 1839. He retired in 1847.

References

1798 births
1859 deaths
Ueekata
Sanshikan
People of the Ryukyu Kingdom
Ryukyuan people
18th-century Ryukyuan people
19th-century Ryukyuan people